Dear Cardholder is a 1987 Australian film about a man who gets in debt on his credit cards. The film failed to find a cinema release, and its director, Bill Bennett, thinks that he made a mistake in not making the film funny enough or its protagonist sufficiently sympathetic. He also says that he probably did not spend enough time on its script.

References

External links

1987 films
Australian comedy films
Films directed by Bill Bennett
1980s English-language films
1980s Australian films